Prof. Olubayi Olubayi (born November 11, 1960 in Kenya, raised in Kenya and educated at Rutgers University in the United States. He is the Chief Academic officer at Maarifa Education, he was the Vice Chancellor/President of the International International University of East Africa in Uganda. He is a scientist and an expert on bacteria, education, learning, leadership and social-entrepreneurship.
As a scientist and eclectic scholar, Olubayi earned his Ph.D. on bacteria-and-plant cell
interactions at Rutgers University, holds a research patent on the flocculation of bacteria
and has published several scholarly articles in microbiology, biotechnology and social
science. As an educator he taught at Middlesex College and at Rutgers University for 16
years, and has taught critical thinking in the IUEA MBA program. He has been
an advisor and consultant to government officials in Kenya and South Africa, and UNDP
on matters of literacy, education, biotechnology, sustainable development and global
citizenship. He is an external advisor to Ph.D. students in the Oxford University-Kemri/Wellcome Trust Research Program in Kilifi, Kenya.
As a social entrepreneur, Olubayi co-founded the nonprofit Kiwimbi International and the widely respected American nonprofit Global Literacy Project which sets up
libraries worldwide and provides global service learning opportunities.
As a thinker, he is the author of the book “Education for a Better World” and a ground breaking scholarly exploration of the emerging National-Culture of Kenya. 

Prof. Olubayi is the Chairman of the University Council at Cavendish University Uganda. He is a Member of the University Council of KCA University, Kenya.  He worked as a consultant for the Ethnic and Race Relations Policy of National Cohesion and Integration Commission of Kenya (NCIC) in 2012 and 2013. He is a  widely cited intellectual voice on “the emerging national culture of unity in Kenya” since 2007. He is also a chairman of Board of Management for St. Thomas Amagoro Girls High School, Busia County, Kenya.

References

External links
International University of East Africa

Living people
1960 births
Rutgers University faculty
Kenyan biologists
Literacy advocates
Academic staff of International University of East Africa
Vice-chancellors of universities in Uganda
Kenyan academics